Oliver Jack Hammond (born 13 November 2002) is a Welsh professional footballer who plays for Nottingham Forest.

Club career

Nottingham Forest
Hammond joined the Nottingham Forest academy at the age of eight-years old. He went on to progress through age groups at the academy, eventually earning his first professional contract with the club on 30 March 2021. He made his professional debut for Forest on 24 August 2021, starting in an EFL Cup fixture against Wolverhampton Wanderers.

International career
Hammond qualifies to play for Wales internationally through his mother. He was called up to the Wales under-21 squad on 4 October 2021.

References

2002 births
Living people
Association football midfielders
Welsh footballers
Footballers from Nottingham
Nottingham Forest F.C. players
Wales under-21 international footballers